752 Is Not a Number is a Canadian documentary film, directed by Babak Payami and released in 2022. The film centres on Hamed Esmaeilion, an Iranian  dentist who is seeking information and justice following the death of his wife and daughter in Iran's 2020 shootdown of Ukraine International Airlines Flight 752.

The film premiered at the 2022 Toronto International Film Festival on September 11, 2022, and was second runner-up for the People's Choice Award for Documentaries.

References

External links

2022 films
2022 documentary films
Canadian documentary films
2020s Canadian films